Peter Glenn Ladygo (June 23, 1928 – August 22, 2014) was an American football player. He played as a guard and linebacker for the Pittsburgh Steelers in the National Football League from 1952 to 1954, and as a guard for the Ottawa Rough Riders in the Canadian Football League in 1955. Ladygo played college football for the University of Maryland.

Early life and college
Ladygo was born on June 23, 1928 in West Brownsville, Pennsylvania and attended Allegheny Prep School. He then went on to Potomac State College before transferring to the University of Maryland. There, he played college football under Jim Tatum and earned varsity letters in 1950 and 1951. In the 1950 upset win against second-ranked Michigan State, Ladygo returned an interception 23 yards for a touchdown. Against George Washington, he had a fumble recovery. In the 1951 season, he recovered a fumble against  in their end zone for Maryland's first touchdown of the year.

Professional career

Pittsburgh Steelers
The Pittsburgh Steelers selected Ladygo with the 186th overall pick in the 16th round of the 1952 NFL Draft. In June, he signed a contract with the franchise. He played three seasons for the Steelers from 1952 to 1954 as a right guard. In 1952, he played in twelve games and returned one kick for four yards. In August 1953, Ladygo was named among five "of the brightest names on the Steelers roster", who remained unsigned because they were dissatisfied with their contract offers. Owner Art Rooney, however, expected them to sign after the start of training camp. Ladygo suffered a broken leg, and did not see game action during the 1953 season. In 1954, Ladygo returned to play in all twelve games.

Ottawa Rough Riders
In 1955, he played for the Ottawa Rough Riders of the Canadian Football League. The Detroit Lions traded a future draft pick to obtain Ladygo's rights before the season, but he stated that it did not change his plans to play in Canada. He said, "I have not signed any contract with Pittsburgh and certainly not with Detroit. The Steelers exercised their option on me last May but I don't feel this entitles the club to my services. I want to play with Ottawa and intend to do so." During the 1955 season, he returned one interception 12 yards. In September, the Ottawa Citizen "put down Pete Ladygo as the outstanding Ottawa lineman." He recovered a fumble against the Hamilton Tiger-Cats, which was later converted into a score. In an "improved" Ottawa squad's rematch against Hamilton, Ladygo, Joe Moss, and Avatus Stone played 55 of the 60-minute game, and the Ottawa Citizen appraised that "they were all immense."

After his season in Canada, Ladygo returned to Keyser, West Virginia, where he worked as a teacher and football coach at Bruce High School in Westernport, Maryland, and as an assistant football coach at Potomac State. He was inducted into the Potomac State College Athletic Hall of Fame in 1988.    He died in Keyser on August 22, 2014.

References

1928 births
2014 deaths
People from Washington County, Pennsylvania
Players of American football from Pennsylvania
American football linebackers
American football offensive guards
American football centers
Potomac State Catamounts football players
Maryland Terrapins football players
Pittsburgh Steelers players
Ottawa Rough Riders players
People from Westernport, Maryland